Varma Agnes Lahtinen (24 December 1894–1 July 1976) was a Finnish actress. She appeared in about 80 Finnish films between 1937 and 1970. Lahtinen starred in six Pekka Puupää films, among others.

Selected filmography
 In the Fields of Dreams (1940)

References

20th-century Finnish actresses
1894 births
1976 deaths